The Last Lion: Winston Spencer Churchill is a trilogy of biographies covering the life of Winston Churchill.  The first two were published in the 1980s by author and historian William Manchester, who died while working on the last volume.  However, before his death, Manchester selected Paul Reid to complete it, and the final volume was published in November 2012.

Volumes

Visions of Glory, 1874–1932
The 973-page volume was published in 1983. In 2011, the book was placed on Time magazine's top 100 non-fiction books written in English since 1923.

Alone, 1932–1940
The 756-page volume was published in 1988.

Defender of the Realm, 1940–1965
The 1232-page volume was published in 2012.  This is the final volume of the late William Manchester's trilogy about the life of Winston Churchill. Manchester died at the age of 82 on June 1, 2004, after suffering for several years from two strokes, following the death of his wife in 1998.  The strokes severely impaired his ability to write, resulting in his announcement, in August 2001, that he would be unable to complete the third volume.  At the time of this announcement, he had completed about 100,000 words of the third volume and had declined approximately twelve inquiries from potential collaborators to complete the book.  His view at the time was that "I have all the research done for the rest of the third volume, a hell of a lot, to the end of Churchill's life.  But what I can't get people to understand is that nobody else can write it.  Nobody has my style.  Nobody could put it in context like I can.  I'm the only person who can write that book."

Before he died, he chose Paul Reid, a former feature writer for Cox Newspapers, to complete the work.

The third volume focuses on Churchill's years as Prime Minister of the United Kingdom during the Second World War.  It was published on November 6, 2012, 24 years after the publication of the previous volume.

Bibliography

References

External links
 "Ailing Churchill Biographer Says He Can't Finish Trilogy", New York Times, August 14, 2001
  "Taming The Last Lion: An NC writer keeps a promise to Winston Churchill biographer William Manchester", Charlotte Observer, November 7, 2010
C-SPAN Q&A interview with Paul Reid about Defender of the Realm, December 23, 2012

British biographies
Multi-volume biographies
Little, Brown and Company books
1983 non-fiction books
1988 non-fiction books
2012 non-fiction books
Biographies of Winston Churchill